The III Reserve Corps was a corps level command of the German Army in World War I.

Formation 
III Reserve Corps was formed on the outbreak of the war in August 1914 as part of the mobilisation of the Army.  It was initially commanded by General der Infanterie Hans von Beseler, recalled from retirement.  It was still in existence at the end of the war.

Structure on formation 
On formation in August 1914, III Reserve Corps consisted of two divisions, made up of reserve units.  In general, Reserve Corps and Reserve Divisions were weaker than their active counterparts
Reserve Infantry Regiments did not always have three battalions nor necessarily contain a machine gun company
Reserve Jäger Battalions did not have a machine gun company on formation
Reserve Cavalry Regiments consisted of just three squadrons
Reserve Field Artillery Regiments usually consisted of two abteilungen of three batteries each
Corps Troops generally consisted of a Telephone Detachment and four sections of munition columns and trains 

In summary, III Reserve Corps mobilised with 25 infantry battalions, 7 machine gun companies (42 machine guns), 6 cavalry squadrons, 12 field artillery batteries (72 guns) and 3 pioneer companies.

Combat chronicle 
On mobilisation, III Reserve Corps was assigned to the 1st Army on the right wing of the forces that invaded France and Belgium as part of the Schlieffen Plan offensive in August 1914.  It was detached from 1st Army to take part in the Siege of Antwerp thereby missing the 1st Army's early battles (Mons, Le Cateau, Marne, Aisne, Arras).  With the conclusion of the siege on 10 October 1914, it was assigned to 4th Army and took part in the First Battle of Ypres.

Commanders 
III Reserve Corps had the following commanders during its existence:

See also 

German Army order of battle (1914)
Order of First Battle of Ypres

References

Bibliography 
 
 
 
 

Corps of Germany in World War I
Military units and formations established in 1914
Military units and formations disestablished in 1918